The Richardson Olmsted Campus in Buffalo, New York, United States, was designated a National Historic Landmark in 1986. The site was designed by the American architect Henry Hobson Richardson in concert with the famed landscape team of Frederick Law Olmsted and Calvert Vaux in the late 1800s, incorporating a system of enlightened treatment for people with mental illness developed by Dr. Thomas Story Kirkbride. Over the years, as mental health treatment changed and resources were diverted, the buildings and grounds began a slow deterioration. In 2006, the Richardson Center Corporation was formed to restore the buildings.

Today, the Richardson Olmsted Campus is being converted, beginning with the now open Hotel Henry Urban Resort Conference Center and 100 Acres: The Kitchens at Hotel Henry, both within the Towers Building and two flanking buildings (about one-third of the Campus). The Richardson Olmsted Campus will also house The Lipsey Architecture Center Buffalo. The remaining buildings have been stabilized pending future opportunities.

History and architecture

The large Medina red sandstone and brick hospital buildings were designed in 1870 in the Kirkbride Plan by architect Henry Hobson Richardson with grounds by landscape architect Frederick Law Olmsted. The campus consists of a central administrative tower and five pavilions or wards progressively set back on each side, for eleven buildings total, all connected by short curved two-story corridors. Patients were segregated by sex, males on the east side, females on the west.  The wards housed patients until the mid-1970s.  The central administration building was used for offices until 1994.

The campus, the largest commission of Richardson's career, marks the advent of his characteristic Romanesque Revival style. When emulated by later architects, this style is referred to as Richardsonian Romanesque.  It has been the subject of a long-term preservation campaign.  Nevertheless, three pavilions on the east side were demolished in the 1970s to make way for newer psychiatric facilities.  In 1927, the northern farmlands were transferred back to the State for the development of what is today Buffalo State College.

In 1973, the Asylum was added to the National Register of Historic Places and in 1986, it was designated a National Historic Landmark.  Patient records from 1881 to 1975 are in the collection of the New York State Archives in Albany, NY.  Architectural plans and drawings are in the H.H. Richardson Collection in the Houghton Library at Harvard University.

Preservation efforts

The Preservation Coalition of Erie County (renamed "Preservation Buffalo Niagara" in October 2008) filed a lawsuit resulting in New York State establishing the Richardson Center Corporation in 2006 to rehabilitate the site and the State committing $100 million towards rehabilitation.  Both former New York State Assembly Member Sam Hoyt, and former Buffalo State College President Muriel A. Howard, were involved in plans for the restoration and reuse of the Richardson.

Perimeter fencing and lighting were installed and a Peace Officer was hired to conduct regular patrols and prevent and deter further crime at the complex.  On March 5, 2008, stabilization began with the most severely damaged buildings, including the roof and down-spouts.  Stabilization was completed in 2012.

On April 10, 2010, a fire occurred. The cause of the fire was under investigation. Damage was estimated at $200,000.

In 2013, the South Lawn landscape on the property was completed.

During the planning stages, the Richardson Center Corporation has used an active public process, aimed to help to inform the Master Plan during all phases of redevelopment for the Campus, including several public meetings.  A Community Advisory Group includes representatives from the adjacent neighborhoods, business districts, cultural institutions, Buffalo Psychiatric Center, SUNY Buffalo State, and historic preservation groups.

Currently, the building is being restored by Douglas Development Corporation and Antunovich Associates.

Hotel Henry Urban Resort Conference Center
On January 25, 2013, Phase I plans were announced to redevelop one third of the Campus into Hotel Henry Urban Resort Conference Center, 100 Acres: The Kitchens at Hotel Henry and the Buffalo Architecture Center, both within the Towers Building and two flanking buildings.

This first phase of redevelopment was completed in 2016. Hotel Henry and the 100 Acres opened in May 2017, and the architecture center will open thereafter.

In popular culture

In 1983 a portion of a ground floor hallway and one hospital room were prepared to appear as a maternity ward and used as a location for The Natural, where the character Roy Hobbs, as played by Robert Redford, was shown recovering from internal injuries. 

Mount Massive Asylum, the main setting for the 2013 horror game Outlast, was modeled after the Richardson Olmsted Complex.

References

External links 

Hospital buildings completed in 1870
Architecture of Buffalo, New York
Buildings and structures in Buffalo, New York
National Historic Landmarks in New York (state)
Richardsonian Romanesque architecture in New York (state)
Richardson Olmsted Campus
Psychiatric hospitals in New York (state)
Kirkbride Plan hospitals
Historic American Buildings Survey in New York (state)
Hospitals established in 1870
1870 establishments in New York (state)
Hotels in New York (state)
National Register of Historic Places in Buffalo, New York